Caecocaelus is a genus of beetles in the family Carabidae, containing the following species:

 Caecocaelus basilewskyi Straneo, 1949
 Caecocaelus clarkei Straneo, 1979
 Caecocaelus decellei Straneo, 1955
 Caecocaelus elongatus Straneo, 1952
 Caecocaelus kabarensis Straneo, 1956
 Caecocaelus leleupi Straneo, 1951
 Caecocaelus microphthalmus (Jeannel, 1948)
 Caecocaelus ruandanus Straneo, 1952
 Caecocaelus scotti Straneo, 1953

References

Pterostichinae